Pseudoacanthosis nigricans is a cutaneous condition that may be associated with heroin abuse.

See also 
 Miliaria pustulosa
 List of cutaneous conditions

References 

Skin conditions resulting from physical factors